Now or Never is the second studio album released by British ten-piece hip hop group Blazin' Squad. The album was released on 20 November 2003 in the United Kingdom, and peaked at #37 on the UK Albums Chart. The album spawned the singles "We Just Be Dreamin'", "Flip Reverse" and "Here 4 One". It features the rap version of "We Just Be Dreamin'", running at 3:28, instead of the vocal version, running at 3:37. The album cover was photographed in Queenborough, on the Isle of Sheppey. Following the album's commercial failure, the band split in 2004, and Now or Never became their last record to be released as a ten-piece band.

Track listing

Sample credits
"Stop" contains elements from "Easy" written and composed by Lionel Richie, as performed by The Commodores.
"Revolution" contains elements from "Children of the Revolution written and composed by Marc Bolan, as performed by T. Rex.

B-sides
 "Made for Me" – 4:04
 "Easy Come, Easy Go" – 3:29
 "Anything" – 3:44
 "Nothing Like This" – 3:36
 "Who's It Gonna Be?" – 3:15
 "U Know What" – 5:01
 "Mic Check" – 4:03
 "Twisted Up" – 4:36

Charts

Certifications

References

2003 albums
Blazin' Squad albums
Albums produced by Cutfather
East West Records albums